The Ministry for Seniors and Accessibility, is the ministry responsible for issues relating to seniors and persons with disabilities in the Canadian province of Ontario.

Established in June 2018, it helps seniors and people with disabilities stay independent, active, and socially connected. The Ministry also helps seniors stay safe, makes Ontario more accessible for everyone and promotes the benefits of age-diverse, accessible workplaces and communities where everyone is able to participate.

The Ministry provides seniors with information on programs and services, healthy lifestyles and aging; recognizes and promotes seniors' contributions to communities; encourages greater social inclusion and volunteerism among seniors; supports and recognizes age-friendly communities across the province; oversees the Retirement Homes Regulatory Authority (RHRA). It embeds accessibility into government policies, programs and services; supports the development of educational tools and resources on accessibility; oversees the compliance with, and enforcement of, accessibility laws; helps create and update accessibility standards under the Accessibility for Ontarians with Disabilities Act, and promotes employment for people with disabilities by engaging employers, disability organizations, service providers, not-for-profit organizations and educational providers.

The Ministry also oversees the Retirement Homes Regulatory Authority (RHRA), the organization that administers the Retirement Homes Act, 2010 and its regulation on behalf of the government and the Minister’s Accessibility Standards Advisory Council. It administers the following legislation: Retirement Homes Act, 2010; Seniors Active Living Centres Act, 2017; Accessibility for Ontarians with Disabilities Act, 2005, and Ontarians with Disabilities Act, 2001.
 
The current Minister for Seniors and Accessibility is Raymond Cho.

References

External links
 

Seniors Affairs
1982 establishments in Ontario
Seniors' organizations
Ministries established in 2017